Bad Boy is a one-shot comic book by American writer Frank Miller and British artist Simon Bisley. It was published by American company Oni Press in 1999, as a 44-page prestige format comic book.

It was republished in July 2008 in hardcover format by Dynamite Entertainment with two covers, one by Bisley  and the other by Miller.

Plot
Bad Boy follows the story of Jason, a young boy who comes to realize that the couple he thinks are his parents are not his parents at all, and his world is not what it seems to be.

References

Comics by Frank Miller (comics)
1999 comics debuts